Asena Reba Ratu is a Fijian former footballer. She has been a member of the Fiji women's national team.

International career
Ratu capped for Fiji at senior level during the 2010 OFC Women's Championship.

References

Living people
Fijian women's footballers
Fiji women's international footballers
Year of birth missing (living people)
Women's association footballers not categorized by position